Nebria angustula is a species of ground beetle in the Nebriinae subfamily that can be found in Kamchatka, Russia.

References

angustula
Beetles described in 1866
Endemic fauna of Kamchatka